Deviation is an album by American banjoist Béla Fleck, released in 1984. It was recorded with the second classic line-up of the New Grass Revival, consisting of Béla Fleck, Sam Bush, John Cowan and Pat Flynn. The album was dedicated to the memory of Steve Goodman.

Track listing 
All tracks written by Béla Fleck, except where noted.

 "Deviation" – 4:24
 "Reverie" – 1:42
 "Nuns for Nixon" – 4:07
 "Malone" (Kenny Malone) – 1:07
 "Moontides" – 5:35
 "Ambrose" – 6:27
 "OMAC" (Mark O'Connor) – 0:36
 "Jalmon with Salmon" (Sam Bush, John Cowan, Béla Fleck, Kenny Malone) – 2:17
 "Mbanza" – 1:18
 "Places" – 7:11

Personnel
New Grass Revival 
Béla Fleck – banjo
Pat Flynn – guitar
Sam Bush – mandolin
John Cowan – bass

Special Guests:
Kenny Malone - drums, clay pots
Mark O'Connor - fiddle
Jerry Douglas - dobro
Humble - space yodels (end of "Places")

Production
Béla Fleck - production
Bil VornDick  - recording engineer mixer
Melodie Gimple - photography
Willy Matthews - album design

References

1984 albums
Béla Fleck albums
Rounder Records albums